The 2suit (alternately 2-Suit or twosuit) (abbrv. 2S) is a garment designed to facilitate sex in weightless environments. It has been tested in microgravity during a parabolic flight.

History

The 2Suit was invented by Vanna Bonta in 2006 
after she experienced microgravity during a parabolic flight that she flew with the National Space Society in 2004. 
Bonta presented the garment design in 2006 on a panel at a New Space conference of the Space Frontier Foundation.

In 2008, the first 2Suit was manufactured and tested  by a History Channel documentary for the television series The Universe. The episode premiered on December 3, 2008.

The documentary described the 2Suit as "one small step for humankind colonizing the universe." The garment was presented as a utilitarian garment with multiple applications that serves the need for human intimacy and procreation by stabilizing physical proximity in microgravity environments.

Design

The 2suit is a flight suit with a large front flap that can be opened and attached to another 2suit via Velcro strips.

The 2suit is equipped to fasten to a stable surface. The roominess within the garment is adjustable from within. It also is lined with inner harnesses that can adjust the proximity of various points of the wearer's body to the body of another 2suit wearer. A quick-disrobe function removes the garments, optionally leaving the harnesses in place for fixing to a stable surface.

Function and purpose
The function of the 2suit is to allow two or more people to remain in proximity effortlessly in weightless or microgravity environments, permitting physical intimacy and facilitating tandem or adjacent tasks.

References in popular culture
Cracked.com listed the 2Suit as one of "seven real suits that will soon make the world a cooler place." 

The 2Suit has been mentioned in travel and exploration magazines as part of articles on subject like the "400 mile high club."

The 2Suit is discussed as fashion in WIRED, Discovery and other media.

The 2Suit has been the subject of songs, including the Valentine's Days album titled 2Suit, by Binary Bits, and in the Anti-Gravity Love EP track Sex Suit by Irish band Fred and Bob

See also
 Sex in space
 Space tourism
 Space settlement
 Flight suit
 Space advocacy

References

External links
 2suit Adds New Meaning to the Mother of Invention, by Jennipher Adkins; Inventors Digest May 2009; Vol. 25 Issue 5
 Vanna Bonta Talks Sex In Space, by Femail Magazine, Celebrity Interview, 2 December 2008
 The Universe - Sex in Space''; History Channel, Season 3 episodes List

Notes (International 2Suit articles)
 La fantasía del sexo en gravedad cero PERU21; 29 August 2012
 S’envoyer en l’air dans l’espace Par Kieron Monks, Metro World News; 11 Avril 2012
 Seks in de ruimte: is het mogelijk?, By Caroline Hoek; 7 April 2012
 Wakacje w Kosmosie? Dajcie sobie z tym spokój!, by Tomasz Rożek, GAZETA; 17 October 2011
 Oλοσωμη φόρμα για ερωτικές περιπτύξεις στο Διάστημα Space Travels; 16 February 2011
 Tener bebés en el espacio podría ser peligroso FayerWayer, (Science Feature) Boxbyte en Ciencia, Destacados; October 2010
 Haben Astronauten eigentlich Sex im All? BILD magazine; 3 July 2010
 Intergalactisch hoogtepunt Desterren Nieuws, by Bert Carrein; 22 April 2010

Environmental suits
Space colonization
Space advocacy